The United Sabbath-Day Adventist Church is a small African American Christian denomination founded by James K. Humphrey.

History 
It formed in New York City as a breakaway from the Seventh-day Adventist Church in 1929–1930 over racial tensions between black and white people. Its beliefs remained similar to Seventh-day Adventists. At its peak in the 1930s the movement had 15 congregations and smaller "missions" throughout the United States and Jamaica. It began to decline in the same decade. As of 2007, a small number of people remain in a single congregation in New York City.

See also 
 North American Division of Seventh-day Adventists

References 
 Joe Mesar and Tom Dybdahl, "The Utopia Park Affair and the Rise of Northern Black Adventists", Adventist Heritage 1:1 (January 1974), p34–41, 53–54
 James K. Humphrey and the Sabbath-Day Adventists by R.[omauld] Clifford Jones (Jackson: University Press of Mississippi, 2007); publisher's page. Reviewed by Douglas Morgan in Andrews University Seminary Studies 46:2 (Autumn 2008), p273–276. Jones' PhD thesis is Utopia Park, Utopian Church: James K. Humphrey and the Emergence of Sabbath Adventists from Western Michigan University – see abstract

External links 
 "The Beginning of Regional Conferences in the US [part] III" blog by "Hobbes", a Seventh-day Adventist lecturer; September 5, 2006,

Historically African-American Christian denominations
Christian denominations in Jamaica
Adventism